Lucanus maculifemoratus is a beetle of the family Lucanidae. This species is known as Miyama stag beetle (Deep Mountain stag beetle) in Japan. These beetles have a light covering of golden hair on their back, mostly around the rear edges.

Lucanus maculifemoratus is known from northeastern Asia, including Japan,and Russia.

Subspecies
 Lucanus maculifemoratus 
 Lucanus maculifemoratus adachii 
 Lucanus maculifemoratus boileaui
 Lucanus maculifemoratus ferriei
 Lucanus maculifemoratus jilinensis
 Lucanus maculifemoratus maculifemoratus 
 Lucanus maculifemoratus taiwanus
L.dybowski was considered a sub-species of L.maculifemoratus but is now considered an independent species.

Gallery

References

maculifemoratus
Beetles of Asia
Insects of Japan
Insects of Korea
Insects of Russia
Taxa named by Victor Motschulsky
Beetles described in 1861